The Col des Chevrères (elevation ) is a mountain pass situated in the Vosges Mountains in the  Haute-Saône department of France, between Servance and Plancher-les-Mines. The Tour de France cycle race crossed the col for the first time on Stage 10 of the 2014 race.

Cycle racing

Details of climb
The steepest sustained sections are in excess of 11%, although some short sections above Miellin are at 18%.

Tour de France
On 14 July 2014, the Tour de France cycle race crossed the col for the first time en route from Mulhouse to La Planche des Belles Filles. When announcing the route, Christian Prudhomme explained his reasons for deciding to send the 2014 Tour over passes not used previously: "I like to use the other massifs than the usual Alps and Pyrenees. I believe the race can be won and lost anytime."

The first rider over the summit was the Spaniard, Joaquim Rodriguez.

References

Mountain passes of the Vosges
Mountain passes of Bourgogne-Franche-Comté